Alver is a surname, and may refer to:
 Andres Alver (born 1953), Estonian architect
 Berthe Amalie Alver (1846-1905), Norwegian author
 Betti Alver (1906-1989), Estonian poet
 Eduard Alver (1886–1939), Estonian lawyer, policeman, politician, and Commander of the Estonian Defence League 
 Inger Alver (1892-1982), Norwegian writer 
 Jonas Alver (born 1973), Norwegian bass player
 Köksal Alver (born 1970), Turkish sociologist
 Tähti Alver (born 1994), Estonian triple jumper and long jumper

Estonian-language surnames
Norwegian-language surnames